Ukrainians in Poland have various legal statuses: ethnic minority, temporary and permanent residents, and refugees.

According to the Polish census of 2011, the Ukrainian minority in Poland was composed of approximately 51,000 people (including 11,451 without Polish citizenship). Some 38,000 respondents named Ukrainian as their first identity (28,000 as their sole identity), 13,000 as their second identity, and 21,000 declared Ukrainian identity jointly with Polish nationality.

However, these numbers have changed since mid-2010s, with a large influx of economic immigrants and students from Ukraine to Poland, with some estimating their total number at 2 million people. Their status has been regulated according to the Polish and European Union (EU) policies of temporary work permits, temporary residence permits and permanent residence permits.

The number of Ukrainians in Poland rose dramatically following the Russian invasion of Ukraine on 24 February 2022. By 16 August 2022, more than 11.2 million Ukrainian refugees left the territory of Ukraine, of which more than 5.4 million people fled to neighbouring Poland.

Cultural life

The main Ukrainian organizations in Poland include: Association of Ukrainians in Poland, 

 Association of Ukrainians of Podlasie, 
 Ukrainian Society of Lublin, 
 Kyivan Rus Foundation of St. Volodymyr, pictured, 
 Association of Ukrainian Women, 
 Ukrainian Educators' Society of Poland, 
 Ukrainian Medical Society, 
 Ukrainian Club of Stalinist Political Prisoners, 
 Ukrainian Youth Association "", 
 Ukrainian Historical Society, 
 Association of Independent Ukrainian Youth. 

The most important periodicals published in Ukrainian language include: Our Voice weekly, and  bimonthly.

The most important Ukrainian festivals and popular cultural events include: Festival of Ukrainian Culture in Sopot, Youth Market in Gdańsk, Festival of Ukrainian Culture of Podlasie,  in Głębock, Days of Ukrainian Culture in Szczecin and Giżycko, Children Festival in Elbląg,  in Dubicze Cerkiewne, Festival of Ukrainian Children Groups in Koszalin,  in Kruklanki, Ukrainian Folklore Market in Kętrzyn, Under the Common Skies in Olsztyn, and Days of Ukrainian Theatre also in Olsztyn.

History and trends

Since World War II
After the quashing of the Ukrainian Insurgent Army's campaign against the Soviet occupation at the end of World War II by the Soviet Union, about 140,000 Ukrainians residing within the new Polish borders were forcibly relocated. Initially they were encouraged to migrate to the Ukrainian Soviet Socialist Republic, but this was unpopular because of the recent Holodomor. After the Organization of Ukrainian Nationalists and Polish anti-communist resistance movements such as Freedom and Independence began resisting the repatriation of Ukrainians from Poland to the Soviet Union, the Polish People's Republic decided to relocate them internally. The Polish People's Army and Ministry of Public Security forcibly relocated them to northern and western Poland during Operation Vistula, settling them in the former Recovered Territories ceded to Poland at the Tehran Conference of 1943.

A total of 27,172 people declared Ukrainian nationality in the Polish census of 2002. Most of them lived in the Warmian-Masurian Voivodeship (11,881), followed by the West Pomeranian (3,703), Subcarpathian (2,984) and Pomeranian Voivodeships (2,831). Kenan Adam (recognized in Poland as a distinct ethnic group) regard themselves as members of the Ukrainian nation, while others distance themselves from Ukrainians.

Economic migration

Since 1989, following the collapse of the Soviet Union, there has been a new wave of Ukrainian immigration, mostly of job seekers, tradesmen, and vendors, concentrated in larger cities with established markets. After Poland's 2004 accession to the European Union, in order to meet the requirements of the Schengen zone (an area of free movement within the European Union), the government was forced to make immigration to Poland more difficult for people from Belarus, Russia and Ukraine. Nevertheless, Ukrainians consistently receive the most settlement permits and the most temporary residence permits in Poland (see table).  As a result of the Eastern Partnership, Poland and Ukraine have reached a new agreement replacing visas with simplified permits for Ukrainians residing within  of the border. Up to 1.5 million people would benefit from this agreement which took effect on July 1, 2009. In 2017 the visa requirements were finally abolished for short stays of up to 90 days.

After 2014, more Ukrainians from eastern Ukraine, more men, and more younger Ukrainians have been working in Poland.

The overwhelming majority of applications for temporary residence are accepted. As a result, Ukrainians constituted 25% of the entire immigrant population of Poland in 2015.

In January 2016 the Embassy of Ukraine in Warsaw informed that the number of Ukrainian residents in Poland was half a million, and probably around one million in total. The Ukrainian Ambassador to Poland, Andrii Deshchytsia, noted that Ukrainian professionals enjoy a good reputation in Poland, and in spite of their growing numbers, Polish-Ukrainian relations remain very good.

According to the NBP, 1.2 million Ukrainian citizens worked legally in Poland in 2016. 1.7 million short-term work registrations were issued to them in 2017 (an eightfold increase compared to 2013). Ukrainian workers stay in Poland an average of 3–4 months.

The number of permanent residence permits increased from 5,375 in 2010 to 33,624 (14 September 2018), while the number of temporary residence permits increased from 7,415 to 132,099 over the same time period.

About 102,000 Ukrainian citizens received Karta Polaka, of whom some 15,500 obtained permanent residence permits in the period from 2014 to March 2018.

Refugees

Following the 2014–2015 Russian military intervention in Ukraine, including its illegal annexation of Crimea ("Helsinki Declaration"), the situation changed dramatically. Poland began taking in large numbers of refugees from the Russo-Ukrainian War as part of the EU's refugee program. The policy of strategic partnership between Kyiv and Warsaw was extended to military and technical cooperation, but the more immediate task, informed Poland's State secretary Krzysztof Szczerski, was Ukraine's constitutional reform leading to broad decentralization of power. The number of applications for refugee status rose 50 times following the start of War in Donbass in Eastern Ukraine in 2014. However, at the time most applicants were not eligible to claim refugee protection in Poland, because Ukraine as a sovereign country with a democratic government remained fully accountable to its citizens. While the conflict remained frozen until 2022, resident visas in Poland were available in other immigration categories. After the 2022 Russian invasion of Ukraine newly arriving refugees may apply under the standard EU asylum procedure or receive emergency temporary protection.

In 2022, Poland has taken in almost 1.5 million Ukrainian refugees. The magnitude of the migration has resulted in a 50% rise in the population of Rzeszów, the largest city in south-eastern Poland. Warsaw's population has increased by 15%, Kraków's by 23%, and Gdansk's by 34%. Ukrainian refugees have the legal right to reside and work across the European Union. They are also entitled to the same benefits as Poles, including health insurance, free public education, and child allowance.

Less than a month after the invasion, the Polish government established the Aid Fund, run by Bank Gospodarstwa Krajowego, which funds all actions and programs aimed at assisting and integrating Ukrainian refugees.

See also 
 Poland–Ukraine relations
 Polish minority in Ukraine
 Demographics of Poland
 History of the Ukrainian minority in Poland

Notes

Further reading 
 
 Mniejszość ukraińska i migranci z Ukrainy w Polsce, Związek Ukraińców w Polsce, 2019
 Marcin Deutschmann, Rasizm w Polsce w kontekœcie problemów migracyjnych. Próba diagnozy. STUDIA KRYTYCZNE | NR 4/2017: 71-85 | 
 Roman Drozd: Droga na zachód. Osadnictwo ludności ukraińskiej na ziemiach zachodnich i północnych Polski w ramach akcji «Wisła». Warszawa: 1997. 
 Roman Drozd, Igor Hałagida: Ukraińcy w Polsce 1944–1989. Walka o tożsamość (Dokumenty i materiały). Warszawa: 1999.
 Roman Drozd, Roman Skeczkowski, Mykoła Zymomrya: Ukraina — Polska. Kultura, wartości, zmagania duchowe. Koszalin: 1999.
 Roman Drozd: Ukraińcy w najnowszych dziejach Polski (1918–1989). T. I. Słupsk-Warszawa: 2000.
 Roman Drozd: Polityka władz wobec ludności ukraińskiej w Polsce w latach 1944–1989. T. I. Warszawa: 2001.
 Roman Drozd: Ukraińcy w najnowszych dziejach Polski (1918–1989). T. II: "Akcja «Wisła». Warszawa: 2005.
 Roman Drozd: Ukraińcy w najnowszych dziejach Polski (1918–1989). T. III: «Akcja „Wisła“. Słupsk: 2007.
 Roman Drozd, Bohdan Halczak: Dzieje Ukraińców w Polsce w latach 1921–1989. Warszawa: 2010.
 Дрозд Р., Гальчак Б. Історія українців у Польщі в 1921–1989 роках / Роман Дрозд, Богдан Гальчак, Ірина Мусієнко; пер. з пол. І. Мусієнко. 3-тє вид., випр., допов. – Харків : Золоті сторінки, 2013. – 272 с.
 Roman Drozd: Związek Ukraińców w Polsce w dokumentach z lat 1990–2005. Warszawa: 2010.
 Halczak B. Publicystyka narodowo – demokratyczna wobec problemów narodowościowych i etnicznych II Rzeczypospolitej / Bohdan Halczak. – Zielona Góra : Wydaw. WSP im. Tadeusza Kotarbińskiego, 2000. – 222 s.
 Halczak B. Problemy tożsamości narodowej Łemków / Bohdan Halczak // in: Łemkowie, Bojkowie, Rusini: historia, współczesność, kultura materialna i duchowa / red. nauk. Stefan Dudra, Bohdan Halczak, Andrzej Ksenicz, Jerzy Starzyński . Legnica – Zielona Góra: Łemkowski Zespół Pieśni i Tańca "Kyczera", 2007 pp. 41–55 .
 Halczak B. Łemkowskie miejsce we wszechświecie. Refleksje o położeniu Łemków na przełomie XX i XXI wieku / Bohdan Halczak // in: Łemkowie, Bojkowie, Rusini – historia, współczesność, kultura materialna i duchowa / red. nauk. Stefan Dudra, Bohdan Halczak, Roman Drozd, Iryna Betko, Michal Šmigeľ . Tom IV, cz. 1 . – Słupsk - Zielona Góra : [b. w.], 2012 – s. 119–133 .

 
 
Poland